Addams Family Values is a 1993 American supernatural black comedy film directed by Barry Sonnenfeld and written by Paul Rudnick, based on the characters created by Charles Addams. It is the sequel to The Addams Family (1991). The film features almost all the main cast members from the original film, including Anjelica Huston, Raul Julia, Christopher Lloyd, Christina Ricci, Carel Struycken, Jimmy Workman, and Christopher Hart. Joan Cusack plays Debbie Jellinsky, a serial killer who marries Fester Addams (Lloyd) intending to murder him for his inheritance, while teenagers Wednesday (Ricci) and Pugsley (Workman) are sent to summer camp. Compared to its predecessor, which retained something of the madcap approach of the 1960s sitcom, Addams Family Values is played more for very dark and macabre laughs.

The film was well received by critics, in contrast to its predecessor's mixed critical reception. Commercially however, it did not perform as well as the first film in its theatrical run with a box office grossing of $111 million on a budget of $47 million. 
The motion picture is also the final film starring actor Raul Julia and was released just months before his death the following year in 1994.

Plot
Gomez and Morticia Addams hire a nanny named Debbie Jellinsky to take care of their newborn son Pubert after his older siblings (Wednesday and Pugsley's) failed attempts to kill him, for which Gomez and Morticia gently rebuke them.

Unbeknownst to them, Debbie is a serial killer who marries rich bachelors and murders them to collect their inheritances. After Debbie seduces Uncle Fester, Wednesday becomes suspicious of her intentions. To maintain her cover, Debbie tricks Gomez and Morticia into believing Wednesday and Pugsley want to go to summer camp.

Wednesday and Pugsley are sent to Camp Chippewa, managed by the always cheerful and lively Gary and Becky Granger, where they are singled out by the counselors and popular (and snobbish) girl Amanda Buckman for their macabre appearance and behavior. Joel Glicker, a nerdy bookworm and fellow outcast, becomes attracted to Wednesday. Debbie and Fester become engaged.

At her bachelorette party, Debbie is repulsed by the Addams family and their relatives. On their honeymoon, she tries unsuccessfully to kill Fester by throwing a boombox into the bathtub. Frustrated, Debbie forces him to cut ties with his family; when they try to visit Fester and Debbie at their home, they are removed from the premises. The Addams are alarmed to find that Pubert has transformed into a blue-eyed, rosy-cheeked, blond-haired baby. Grandmama diagnoses this as a result of his disrupted family life and Gomez becomes horribly depressed.

At camp, the counselors cast Wednesday as Pocahontas in Gary's Thanksgiving play. When she refuses to participate, she, Pugsley, and Joel are all sent to the camp's "Harmony Hut" and forced to watch hours of wholesome family entertainment movies and television shows. Afterwards, the three feign cheerfulness, and Wednesday agrees to take part. However, during the performance, she reveals her deception and returns to her old self. With help from Joel, Pugsley, and the outcast campers, they capture Amanda, Gary, and Becky and set the camp on fire. Later, Wednesday and Joel share their first kiss before separating, with Joel staying behind to lead their friends to ensure the camp's permanent destruction. Pugsley and Wednesday return home in a stolen camp van.

Debbie tries to kill Fester by blowing up their mansion, but he survives. She then pulls a gun and reveals she never loved him and that she was only interested in his money. Thing helps Fester escape by knocking Debbie aside with her own car. Fester apologizes to Gomez upon his return to the Addams mansion, and Wednesday and Pugsley return, successfully reuniting the family. Debbie arrives in another car, holds the family at gunpoint, and straps them into electric chairs with the intent of killing them. As the Addamses listen sympathetically, she admits that she killed her parents and her first two husbands for incredibly frivolous and materialistic reasons. Pubert, now restored to his normal, pale, mustachioed self, escapes from his crib and reaches the rest of the family via a series of improbable events. As Debbie throws the switch to electrocute the family, he connects two loose wires that route the current through her instead. Debbie's body burns to ashes, leaving only her shoes and credit cards intact.

Some time later, the Addamses and their relatives gather to celebrate Pubert's first birthday, with Joel also attending. Fester laments Debbie's loss, but soon becomes smitten with Dementia, a nanny whom Cousin Itt and his wife Margaret Alford have hired to care for their child. Out in the family graveyard, Wednesday tells Joel that Debbie was a sloppy killer, and that Wednesday would have scared her victim to death and made sure not to be caught. As Joel lays flowers on Debbie's grave, a hand (implied to be Thing) emerges from the earth and grabs him, prompting Wednesday to smile as he screams.

Cast
 Anjelica Huston as Morticia Addams
 Raul Julia as Gomez Addams
 Christopher Lloyd as Fester Addams
 Christina Ricci as Wednesday Addams
 Christopher Hart as Thing
 Carel Struycken as Lurch
 Jimmy Workman as Pugsley Addams
 Carol Kane as Grandmama Addams (replacing Judith Malina)
 John Franklin as Cousin Itt
 Joan Cusack as Debbie Jellinsky
 Dana Ivey as Margaret Alford-Addams (wife of Cousin Itt Addams)
 David Krumholtz as Joel Glicker
 Kaitlyn and Kristen Hooper as Pubert Addams
 Peter MacNicol as Gary Granger
 Christine Baranski as Becky Martin-Granger
 Mercedes McNab as Amanda Buckman, a camper at Camp Chippewa (McNab played the Girl Scout in the first film)

Cameo roles
 Director Barry Sonnenfeld and Julie Halston as the parents of Joel Glicker.
 Nathan Lane as the police desk sergeant. Lane would eventually go on to play Gomez in the Addams Family Broadway musical.
 David Hyde Pierce as the delivery room doctor
 Peter Graves as America's Most Disgusting Unsolved Crimes anchorman
 Sam McMurray and Harriet Sansom Harris as Amanda's parents
 Ian Abercrombie as a driver
 Chris Ellis as a furniture delivery driver
 Tony Shalhoub as Jorge
 Cynthia Nixon as a nanny interviewee

Production
The "family values" in the film's title is a tongue-in-cheek reference by writer Paul Rudnick to a 1992 speech ("Reflections on Urban America") made by then-Vice Presidential candidate Dan Quayle. In the speech, Quayle controversially blamed the 1992 Los Angeles riots on a breakdown of "family values".

According to Anjelica Huston, during the filming of Addams Family Values, it became increasingly clear that Raul Julia's health was deteriorating. He had trouble eating and was losing weight as a result. He died less than a year after the film was released.

Sequoia National Park, particularly Sequoia Lake, in the Sierra Nevada of California, was the site of the movie's "Camp Chippewa".

Music
 Addams Family Values: The Original Orchestral Score composed by Marc Shaiman
 Addams Family Values: Music from the Motion Picture Various artist soundtrack album

Michael Jackson's involvement 
American singer Michael Jackson was supposed to feature a song in the film called "Addams Groove/Family Thing". The song is mostly rumored to have been removed due to the child sexual abuse allegations against Jackson; in reality, it was because of contractual differences with Paramount Pictures. The song has since been leaked online. Jackson is referenced in the film via a poster in the Harmony Hut advertising his 1992 single "Heal the World", which horrifies Joel.

Reception

Box office
Addams Family Values opened at number 1 at the US box office in its opening weekend with a reported gross of $14,117,545. In its second week, the film dropped to number 2 behind Mrs. Doubtfire, and in its third week to number 3 behind Mrs. Doubtfire and A Perfect World. Its final box office gross in the United States and Canada was $48,919,043, a significant decline from the previous film's domestic total of $113,502,426. Internationally it grossed $62 million, for a worldwide total of $110.9 million.

In retrospect, Barry Sonnenfeld recalled: "I was disappointed in the box office for the second film. I think the first film is more romantic and the second film is funnier. Part of the reason it didn't do as well is that the marketing of the movie was so similar to the first one that people didn't think it was going to be any value-added and I really wanted to push the Pubert of it all and the Fester of it all. Instead, the whole campaign was back with the original Addams Family, so it wasn't really promising anything new. I think that's in part why it didn't do as well. Many people love it as much or more as the first one".

Critical response

Addams Family Values was well received, receiving significantly better reviews than the first film. On review aggregation website Rotten Tomatoes, the film received an approval rating of 75% based on 114 reviews, with an average rating of 6.7/10. The site's critical consensus reads: "New, well-developed characters add dimension to this batty satire, creating a comedy much more substantial than the original". On Metacritic, the film has a weighted average score of 61 out of 100 based on 21 critics, indicating "generally favorable reviews". Audiences surveyed by CinemaScore gave the film an average grade of "B+" on an A+ to F scale, a grade up from the "B" earned by the previous film.

Janet Maslin of The New York Times wondered if "the making of this sequel was sheer drudgery for all concerned", then answered herself by writing: "There's simply too much glee on the screen, thanks to a cast and visual conception that were perfect in the first place and a screenplay by Paul Rudnick that specializes in delightfully arch, subversive humor". Leonard Klady of Variety was slightly less enthusiastic than Maslin: "It remains perilously slim in the story department, but glides over the thin ice with technical razzle-dazzle and an exceptionally winning cast". Richard Schickel, writing for Time, was even less enthuastic than Klady, calling the film "an essentially lazy movie, too often settling for easy gags and special effects that don't come to any really funny point". Both Gene Siskel and Roger Ebert had disliked the first film. Siskel gave Addams Family Values a mixed review and accused Sonnenfeld of caring more about how the film looks than how the jokes play. Ebert, however, gave the film three stars out of four and thought that, unusually for a sequel, it improved upon its predecessor. He enjoyed the various subplots and recommended the film.

Accolades
The film was nominated for an Academy Award in the category Best Art Direction (Ken Adam, Marvin March), but lost to Schindler's List; and Huston was nominated for the 1993 Golden Globe Award for Best Actress – Motion Picture Musical or Comedy for her performance as Morticia, a reprise of her Golden Globe-nominated performance in the 1991 original. The film won also a Golden Raspberry Award for Worst Original Song for the Tag Team track "Addams Family (Whoomp!)". Addams Family Values was nominated for AFI's 100 Years...100 Laughs. In 2016, James Charisma of Playboy ranked the film #15 on a list of 15 Sequels That Are Way Better Than The Originals.

Home media

The Addams Family Values video game was produced by Ocean Software.

The film was released on VHS and DVD in 2000 with only two theatrical trailers as special features. It was re-released in 2006 with the first film on a single disc, with no new features.

In October 2019, the film debuted on the Blu-ray format when Paramount Pictures released double feature of Addams Family and Addams Family Values on Blu-ray in the United States, along with standalone releases. In Australia, the film was released on VHS by Paramount Home Entertainment (Australasia) in 1994. In 2002 the film was released on DVD with theatrical trailers in the extra features.

Notes

References

External links

 
 
 
 

1993 films
1990s black comedy films
1990s comedy horror films
1990s fantasy comedy films
1990s screwball comedy films
1990s serial killer films
American black comedy films
American comedy horror films
American fantasy comedy films
American screwball comedy films
American sequel films
American serial killer films
The Addams Family films
1990s English-language films
Films about witchcraft
Films based on adaptations
Films based on television series
Films directed by Barry Sonnenfeld
Films produced by Scott Rudin
Films scored by Marc Shaiman
Films set in country houses
Films shot in California
Golden Raspberry Award winning films
Mariticide in fiction
Patricide in fiction
Paramount Pictures films
Films about summer camps
Thanksgiving horror films
Films with screenplays by Paul Rudnick
1993 comedy films
1990s American films